Fist of the North Star: Lost Paradise is an action role-playing video game developed by Ryu Ga Gotoku Studio and published by Sega for the PlayStation 4. It is based on the manga franchise Fist of the North Star by Buronson and Tetsuo Hara, and features the gameplay and mechanics of Sega's Like a Dragon game series. It was released in Japan on March 8, 2018 and worldwide on October 2, 2018.

Gameplay 
Lost Paradise is an action role-playing game played from a third-person perspective. It features experience points, abilities; and similar action-adventure gameplay mechanics and systems to Sega's own Yakuza series. Players explore the city of Eden, fighting through enemy encounters in a beat 'em up gameplay style, punctuated by quick time events.

The action is centered on the "Hidden Channeling Points" system, one of the key elements of Hokuto Shinken, the main martial arts style of the series. There are also various mini-games, such as bartending, baseball, racing, and retro games  such as Hokuto no Ken for the Sega Mark III, Space Harrier, Out Run and Super Hang-On, that can be played after being salvaged from the wastelands.

Plot

Setting

The story takes place in a post-apocalyptic alternate timeline Earth. Due to a worldwide nuclear war, the earth's surface became devoid of vegetation, the seas evaporated and civilization was thrown into chaos, turning everyday life into a battle for supplies of uncontaminated food and water, where the strong survive by preying on the weak. Yet, in a corner of that world, there is a place called “The City of Miracles,” a city named “Eden”. Eden receives energy and water from a giant dome-shaped relic of the old world named “Sphere City". Citizens of Eden live a comfortable life that others in this era cannot even imagine.

Kenshiro, successor of the martial art Hokuto Shinken, was defeated by Shin, who proceeded to kidnap his fiancée, Yuria. Kenshiro thus travels through the wastelands to find his beloved. He eventually hears rumors that a woman called Yuria could be found in the city of Eden so he makes his way to Eden to find Yuria.

Synopsis
Kenshiro, fourth brother and successor of Hokuto Shinken, ascends the tower of his rival, Shin, to find Yuria. At the top, he challenges him to duel, which ends in Shin's defeat. A dying Shin laments that Yuria is dead. Rumors surface that Yuria is alive in a city called Eden, a settlement maintained by a structure called Sphere City generating water and electricity. Finding the city locked off to outsiders, Kenshiro allows himself to be captured as a criminal. Kenshiro learns that he can earn his freedom through a tournament. After defeating the final contender, Devil Rebirth, Kenshiro is given citizenship by the ruler, Xsana. Kenshiro later faces the Army of Ruin, led by Kyo-Oh and his second-in-command Targa. Jagre, Eden's watch captain, is afflicted with an ailment. Kenshiro journeys to the legendary prison, Cassandra, to find  Toki, second brother of Hokuto Shinken, who can potentially heal him. After defeating the guards and killing warden Uighur, Kenshiro frees Toki, who cures Jagre. Toki refuses to leave Cassandra, as Raoh, first successor to Hokuto Shinken, would launch a full-scale assault, but agrees to train Kenshiro. Meanwhile, Kenshiro comes to befriend Jagre, as well as Lyra, who manages Eden's nightclub.

Kenshiro is summoned to the arena by Rei, who accuses him of killing his parents and kidnapping his sister. Kenshiro defeats him in battle, and Rei's sister Airi is revealed to him. After Kenshiro cures Airi's blindness, Rei asks Kenshiro for help in tracking down the culprit. Xsana reveals that Yuria is housed within Sphere City, in a room called the Chamber of Miracles. Her father, Nadai, entered the chamber at some point with his wife, who died inside. Thinking Nadai killed her mother, Xsana stabbed him in rage. Kenshiro and Jagre reach a village where they encounter zombified villagers, revealed to be the result of Meito Kieiken, which was used by Kyo-Oh on Jagre. At the summit, Kenshiro meets a man who challenges him to a duel, revealing himself to be Nadai upon defeat. The two then notice that Eden is under siege by the Holy Imperial Army, led by Thouzer. Fighting his way through, Kenshiro finds that Hokuto Shinken is ineffective against Thouzer, but defeats him after deducing that his immunity was due to situs inversus. With Eden's gate destroyed, Xsana decides to open up the city's walls. Rei deduces that his sister's kidnapper is in Eden, managing to track him down with Kenshiro. The kidnapper is revealed to be Jagi, the third brother of Hokuto Shinken. Kenshiro challenges Jagi to a duel at the arena, and gains the upper hand thanks to Nadai, allowing Rei to execute Jagi. Rei thanks Kenshiro and bids him farewell. Meanwhile, Targa is sent back to the Army of Ruin.

Sphere City is activated, and Xsana reveals it is a military facility housing the last nuclear missiles, their launch tied to Yuria's awakening in the Chamber of Miracles. Raoh appears, revealing that he and Nadai were working to preserve the secret of Sphere City. Nadai used the Chamber of Miracles to heal his wife, who refused, and they were trying to keep Yuria alive to use her to power beyond Hokuto Shinken. With Nadai presumed dead, Raoh decides kill Yuria. Kenshiro reveals that Nadai is alive, and challenges Raoh to a duel that ends in a draw. Raoh, respecting Kenshiro's dedication to Yuria, decides to put their fight on hold. Concluding that Kyo-Oh and Nadai are the same, Kenshiro infiltrates the Army of Ruin's camp, attempting to convince him to help. Kyo-Oh reveals he's Targa in disguise, buying time for Nadai to enter Sphere City and kill Yuria. Kenshiro runs back to Eden and finds Nadai, but are ambushed by Targa, Jagre and Lyra. The three have collaborated to exact revenge on Nadai for killing Jagre's father and driving other two's insane. Jagre is unable to bring himself to harm Xsana. Tagra shoots Jagre and Lyra, revealing his intentions to use Sphere City's missiles, wiping out Earth's population to become a god, and use Yuria to conceive a child who would carry his legacy. After killing Tagra, Kenshiro closes Sphere City's dome and opens the Chamber of Miracles to free Yuria, but Nadai pushes them into the Chamber of Miracles, sacrificing himself. Xsana and a surviving Jagre continue to help with ruling and protecting Eden, while Kenshiro and Yuria decide to forge their own path.

Development and Marketing 

Lost Paradise was announced on August 26, 2017 for PlayStation 4. Studio head Toshihiro Nagoshi elaborated that the title would not make use of their new Dragon Engine, developed for Yakuza 6, as the development team was composed of largely new staff, who were not used to the more demanding tools of the Dragon Engine.

The Japanese voice cast features many of the actors from the Yakuza series portraying characters analogous to those they played in previous Yakuza titles, such as Kazuma Kiryu voice actor Takaya Kuroda playing Kenshiro. The worldwide release of the game includes an English dub, making it the studio's third game since the original Yakuza and Binary Domain to feature one. It is also the first Fist of the North Star game since the first Ken's Rage to have an English dub, as Ken's Rage 2 did not have one due to budget constraints. The worldwide release also includes an option to increase the amount of in-game gore that is exhibited on screen.

Sega launched a marketing campaign in Japan, starring actor Takayuki Yamada. In the ad campaign, the actor goes to the gym, performing famous moves and gestures from the manga series. During E3 2018, Sega announced the western release of Lost Paradise with a trailer and a large presence at Sega's booth. An additional piece of downloadable content allows players to control Yakuza protagonist Kazuma Kiryu in place of Kenshiro, and was briefly available for free for the first two weeks after launch.

Reception 

Fist of the North Star Lost Paradise was a success in Japan where it sold 123,116 copies in its first week of release. It became the first game of 2018 to topple Capcom's Monster Hunter: World which remained at the top of the charts for seven consecutive weeks.

The game won the award for "Writing in a Comedy" at the National Academy of Video Game Trade Reviewers Awards, whereas its other nomination was for "Game, Franchise Action".

Notes

References

External links

2018 video games
Action role-playing video games
Alternate history video games
Fist of the North Star video games
Martial arts video games
Open-world video games
Organized crime video games
PlayStation 4 games
PlayStation 4-only games
PlayStation 4 Pro enhanced games
Post-apocalyptic video games
Science fantasy video games
Science fiction comedy
Sega beat 'em ups
3D beat 'em ups
Single-player video games
Video games developed in Japan
Video games set in the future
Yakuza (franchise)